Farasuto Forest is a relict patch of what might best be described as ‘wet evergreen forest’ though the place is only really wet during the rains – broadly from June to October.

About a century ago most of the Gambia was reported to be covered by dense and almost impenetrable forest even after large areas had been cleared for groundnut cultivation. At that time the forests were rich in wildlife and habitat for a variety of large mammals which are nowadays rare (such as hippopotamus, waterbuck, roan) or extinct (such as buffalo, giraffe, elephant, lion etc.)” FAO Corporate Document Repository.

Farasuto Forest is among the few remaining and now isolated forest patches left in the whole of the Gambia. It transpires that the forest surrounding Farasuto was cut down about 60 years ago (from local information), that is in the late 1940s. The section which is now the reserve was in earlier days used as a place for ceremonial male and female circumcisions and was therefore spared. It may be compared with the somewhat larger Abuko forest which will be known to many visitors to the country. Abuko is the Gambia's largest remnant block of forest (around 45 ha, 110 acres; more if you include the reserve's woodland) and is apparently the Gambia's most visited tourist destination. Farasuto Forest is small in comparison (4.5ha, 11 acres) and lies about 10 miles south-east of Abuko.

Fauna
The Gambia's remaining forests accommodate a singular suite of organisms. The assembly of birds unique to West African forests is well-known, generally well documented and is also outlined here. Other forest plants and animals are equally restricted in their occurrence, unique to the habitat though less is readily available about them and there are fewer specialists identifying and recording them, certainly not in comparison to the attention accorded to forest birds.

Flora

In comparison with the remainder of the site's flora the identification and mapping of trees is likely to be a shade more straightforward.

The number of tree species is probably less than that for other flowering plants and help has already been offered by the Western District Forest Department's Eco-tourism Officer. The larger specimen trees should be relatively easy to list, number, measure, identify to species and map. A hand-held GPS unit has been donated to the group and during the dry season it should be possible to get signals through the forest canopy and determine precise positions for the larger trees. When the trees are identified and mapped it should be possible to assess their conservation importance – it is believed that some of the forest trees are significant rarities – time will tell.

Similarly it should be possible to use GPS to obtain exact locations for the larger ant-hill/termite mounds and other prominent features such as pathway junctions which will help produce a definitive map of the site, essential for the proposed Management Plan.

Why Farasuto
The significance of Farasuto forest is fully understood by the people of Kuloro, the village within which the site lies on the southern banks of the Gambia River 11 miles due south of the capital Banjul. Local people concerned about the site (the forest patch and some adjoining woodland, total area around 9ha) and its future held the first public Open Day there on 25 October 2008. the forest project founders were introduced to the site during a three-week visit to country in January 2009 and an open meeting was arranged, with all village interests attending, on 20 January. Through an interpreter they explained that they were prepared to help prepare a Management Plan for their nature reserve. The offer of help was very gratefully and warmly received and work has begun. The Management Plan is an essential component in plotting a secure future for the site and its wildlife, not least its birds – its major attraction. The Plan will also act as a bidding document for the works identified as necessary for successful and sustainable management into the long term.

Further information
For further information you can go to http://farasuto.org

Geography of the Gambia
Forests of the Gambia